Paterson railway station may refer to:
Paterson railway station (Manitoba), a Via Rail flag stop station in Canada
Paterson railway station, New South Wales, on the North Coast line in Australia
Paterson station, an NJT station in New Jersey, United States

See also
 Patterson station (disambiguation)